Yevhen Anatoliyovych Chumak (born 25 August 1995) is a Ukrainian professional football midfielder who plays for the Uzbekistani club Dinamo Samarqand.

Career

Early years
He is a product of Dynamo Kyiv and RVUFK Kyiv sportive schools. His first coach was Oleksandr Shpakov.

Dynamo Kyiv
He made his debut and scored his first goal in the Ukrainian Premier League for Dynamo Kyiv on 1 March 2015 in a match against Metalist Kharkiv.

Honours

Club

Dynamo Kyiv
 Ukrainian Premier League: 2014–15
 Ukrainian Cup: 2014–15

References

External links

1995 births
Living people
Sportspeople from Vinnytsia Oblast
Ukrainian footballers
Association football midfielders
Piddubny Olympic College alumni
Ukraine youth international footballers
Ukraine under-21 international footballers
FC Dynamo Kyiv players
FC Hoverla Uzhhorod players
FC Torpedo-BelAZ Zhodino players
FC Zirka Kropyvnytskyi players
FC Karpaty Lviv players
FC Dnepr Mogilev players
FC Desna Chernihiv players
FC Shevardeni-1906 Tbilisi players
FC Bunyodkor players
PFK Metallurg Bekabad players
FC Turan players
FK Dinamo Samarqand players
Ukrainian Premier League players
Ukrainian First League players
Belarusian Premier League players
Erovnuli Liga 2 players
Uzbekistan Super League players
Kazakhstan Premier League players
Ukrainian expatriate footballers
Expatriate footballers in Belarus
Ukrainian expatriate sportspeople in Belarus
Expatriate footballers in Georgia (country)
Ukrainian expatriate sportspeople in Georgia (country)
Expatriate footballers in Uzbekistan
Ukrainian expatriate sportspeople in Uzbekistan
Expatriate footballers in Kazakhstan
Ukrainian expatriate sportspeople in Kazakhstan